Milicia may refer to:

Milicia (river), a river in Sicily that has its mouth at Palermo
Milicia (plant), a plant genus in the family Moraceae
 Incorrect spelling of militia, an armed group of irregulars, often citizens of a community, organizing behind a cause

pt:Milicia